Staunton may refer to:

Places

Canada
 Staunton, Ontario, an unincorporated place

Hong Kong
 Staunton Street on Hong Kong Island

United Kingdom
 Staunton (near Coleford), a village in the west part of the Forest of Dean, Gloucestershire
 Staunton (near Gloucester), a village in Gloucestershire, near the border with Worcestershire
 Staunton, Nottinghamshire
 Staunton on Arrow, Herefordshire
 Staunton on Wye, Herefordshire

United States
 Staunton, Illinois, a city
 Staunton Township, Illinois, a township
 Staunton, Indiana, a town
 Staunton, Ohio, an unincorporated community
 Staunton Township, Ohio, a township
 Staunton, Virginia, a city
 Staunton Natural Area, a protected area of Staunton State Park, Colorado
 Staunton State Park, Colorado
 Staunton River, a portion of the Roanoke River in central Virginia

Other uses
Staunton (surname), including a list of people with the name
Staunton chess set, a set of chessmen

See also
Stanton (disambiguation)
Saunton, a village in Devon, England
Taunton, a town in Somerset, England